Emergency 2: The Ultimate Fight for Life is the second game in the Emergency series, published in 2003.

Reception
On Metacritic the game has a score of 55% based on reviews from 5 critics.

Reviews
 PC Games (Germany) - Nov, 2002
 GameStar (Germany) - Nov, 2002
 GameSpot - Apr 24, 2003

References

2003 video games
Medical video games
Tactical role-playing video games
Video games about firefighting
Video games about police officers
Video games developed in Germany
Windows games
Windows-only games